The 1985 Women's African Volleyball Championship was the Second Edition African continental volleyball Championship for women in Africa and it was held in Tunis, Tunisia, with Four teams participated.

Teams

Final ranking

References

1985 Women
African championship, Women
Women's African Volleyball Championship
International volleyball competitions hosted by Tunisia